Mavis Louisa Freeman (30 January 1907 – 1992) was an Australian bacteriologist and biochemist. She assisted Macfarlane Burnet in identifying the source of Q fever.

Early life and education 
Mavis Louisa Freeman was born in Ballarat, Victoria on 30 January 1907 to Louisa (née Lutzen) and Harry Stanley Freeman. She completed her primary education at Esperance Girls' School, Brighton where she was dux of classes III and IV. She then attended Firbank Girls' Grammar School where she was dux of the school in 1924. On leaving school she won a scholarship to Trinity College at the University of Melbourne from which she graduated with a BSc in 1928.

Career 
Freeman's first job was at the Walter and Eliza Hall Institute where she was employed as a research fellow. Her work included studying snake venoms with Charles Kellaway and proteins with biochemist H. F. Holden.

In 1934 she won the Victorian Women Graduates' Association Travelling Scholarship and went to London to continue her studies at the Lister Institute. She returned to the Walter and Eliza Hall Institute and, in 1939, assisted Macfarlane Burnet in the discovery of the source of Q fever.

In World War II she was appointed as pathologist to the Second Australian Hospital, A.I.F. in Palestine and was the only woman to serve overseas, other than nurses and masseuses.

Freeman returned to the Walter and Eliza Hall Institute after the war but resigned in 1948 and moved to Adelaide to work at the Institute of Medical and Veterinary Research. She completed an MSc at the University of Melbourne in 1950.

Freeman died in Malvern, Victoria in 1992.

References 

1907 births
1992 deaths
People educated at Trinity College (University of Melbourne)
Australian bacteriologists
Australian biochemists
20th-century Australian women scientists
20th-century biologists
20th-century chemists
Women bacteriologists
Women biochemists
Australian women biologists
Australian women chemists
People from Ballarat
People educated at Firbank Girls' Grammar School